The 1984 Swedish Golf Tour was the inaugural season of the Swedish Golf Tour, a series of professional golf tournaments held in Sweden.

Schedule
The season consisted of seven events played between May and September.

Order of Merit

Sources:

References

Swedish Golf Tour
Swedish Golf Tour